Galileo Ferraris (31 October 1847 – 7 February 1897) was an Italian university professor, physicist and electrical engineer, one of the pioneers of AC power system and inventor of the induction motor although he never patented his work. Many newspapers touted that his work on the induction motor and power transmission systems were some of the greatest inventions of all ages. He published an extensive and complete monograph on the experimental results obtained with open-circuit transformers of the type designed by the power engineers Lucien Gaulard and John Dixon Gibbs.

Biography 

Born at Livorno Vercellese (Kingdom of Sardinia), Ferraris gained a master's degree in engineering and became an assistant of technical physics near the Regal Italian Industrial Museum. Ferraris independently researched the rotary magnetic field in 1885. Ferraris experimented with different types of asynchronous electric motors. The research and his studies resulted in the development of an alternator, which may be thought of as an alternating-current motor operating in reverse, so as to convert mechanical (rotating) power into electric power (as alternating current). 
  
On 11 March 1888, Ferraris published his research in a paper to the Royal Academy of Sciences in Turin (two months later Nikola Tesla gained , application filed October 12, 1887. Serial Number 252,132). These alternators operated by creating systems of alternating currents displaced from one another in phase by definite amounts, and depended on rotating magnetic field for their operation. The resulting source of polyphase power soon found widespread acceptance. The invention of the polyphase alternator is key in the history of electrification, as is the power transformer. These inventions enabled power to be transmitted by wires economically over considerable distances. Polyphase power enabled the use of water-power (via hydroelectric generating plants in large dams) in remote places, thereby allowing the mechanical energy of the falling water to be converted to electricity, which then could be fed to an electric motor at any location where mechanical work needed to be done. This versatility sparked the growth of power-transmission network grids on continents around the globe.

In 1889, Ferraris worked at the Italian Industrial Institution, a school of electrical engineering (the first school of this kind in Italy, subsequently incorporated in the Politecnico di Torino). In 1896, Ferraris joined the Italian Electrotechnical Association and became the first national president of the organization.

Galileo Ferraris did not confine his research interests to electricity. He also researched the fundamental properties of dioptric instruments and made elementary representation of the theory and its applications. His work contains a detailed description of the geometric dioptrics for uncentered systems. He provided a greater generality as previously found in the telescopic system treatments, with less emphasis on applications.

In the second main sections, the results obtained are applied to optical instruments. The magnification, field of view, and the brightness of the instrument were dealt with in great detail. The field denned as the author of the cone opening angle, the tip of the first main points of the lens, and its base formed by the parts of the object in view, will possess the same brightness. The eye is not treated.

Memorials

The city of Turin honored the contributions that Ferraris made to science. A general committee proposed an addition to the Royal Industrial Museum of Turin with a permanent monument commemorating his scientific and industrial achievements. Additionally, an avenue was named in honor of Ferraris.

In January 2021 Ferraris was honored by the IEEE Milestones program for his contribution to "the technological innovation and excellence for the benefit of humanity", namely for his “Rotating Fields and Early Induction Motors, 1885-1888”. The according plaque carries the inscription:Galileo Ferraris, professor at the Italian Industrial Museum (now Polytechnic) of Turin, conceived and demonstrated the principle of the rotating magnetic field. Ferraris’ field, produced by two stationary coils with perpendicular axes, was driven by alternating currents phase-shifted by 90 degrees. Ferraris also constructed prototypes of two-phase AC motors. Rotating fields, polyphase currents, and their application to induction motors had a fundamental role in the electrification of the world.

Publications
  
 
 
 Sulle differenze di fase delle correnti e sulla dissipazione di energia nei trasformatori, by Prof. Galileo Ferraris (Turin, 1887).
 
 
 
 Online texts : vol. 1 vol. 2 vol. 3

References

Further reading

External links 
 B. Bowers, "Scanning our past from London: Galileo Ferraris and alternating current" in Proceedings of the IEEE, vol. 89, no. 5, pp. 790–792, May 2001, doi: 10.1109/5.929656.
M. Mitolo and M. Tartaglia, "Galileo Farraris - A Life Dedicated to the Electric Sciences [History]" in IEEE Industry Applications Magazine, vol. 22, no. 5, pp. 8–11, Sept.-Oct. 2016, doi: 10.1109/MIAS.2016.2574223.
Raffaella Gobbo, L'archivio di Galileo Ferraris, Roma, Amministrazione degli Archivi di Stato, 2005. Estratto da: Rassegna degli Archivi di Stato, n. s., 1 (2005), n. 1-2, 9–169 p. Chronology of Galileo Ferarris, 24-33 p.   
 Museo Ferraris
 Opere di Galileo Ferraris Vol. 1.
  Opere di Galileo Ferraris Vol. 2.
 Galileo Ferraris: Inventor of an induction motor.
 Galileo Ferraris - "Father of three-phase current" - Electrotechnical Congress, Frankfurt 1891,  Who Invented the Polyphase Electric Motor?
   M. Mitolo, M.Tartaglia, Galileo Ferraris: A Life Dedicated to the Electrical Sciences, IEEE Industry Appl. Magazine, 2016, pp 8-11 
 Power Electric Circuits: Pacinotti and Ferraris The pioneering age of power circuits, pp. 51-58 in A Short History of Circuits and Systems 
 Silvanus Phillips Thompson: Polyphase electric currents and alternate current motors
Univ.Prof. Dr.Ing. Martin Doppelbauer: The invention of the electric motor,  Karlsruhe Institute of Technology - KIT   
   The History of Alternating Current  
  Brian Bowers, Galileo Ferraris and Alternating Current, IEEE Proc, vol. 89, n.5, May 2001, pp. 790-792
   Galileo Ferraris, Rotazioni elettrodinamiche prodotte per mezzo di correnti alternate (Electrodynamic rotations by means of alternating currents), memory read at Accademia delle Scienze, Torino, March 1888 in Opere di Galileo Ferraris, Hoepli, Milano,1902 vol I pp 333-348  
WilliamStanley: Alternating-current development in America
  Katz, Eugenii, "Galileo Ferraris". Biosensors & Bioelectronics.
 Istituto Elettrotecnico Nazionale Galileo Ferraris (IEN) – Official web site (English)
 Alternating Current Development in America by William Stanley
 Galileo Ferraris, Britannica

1847 births
1897 deaths
Italian electrical engineers
19th-century Italian physicists
19th-century Italian inventors
People from the Province of Vercelli
19th-century Italian engineers